Frank Ben Tipton (born 1943) is an Australian historian and  Emeritus Professor at The University of Sydney Business School. He is known for his works on Modern history of Germany and Economic history.

Bibliography
 Tipton FB 1976 'Regional Variations in the Economic Development of Germany during the Nineteenth Century', Wesleyan University Press, Middletown, Connecticut, United States 
 Tipton, F. and Robert Aldrich. An Economic and Social History of Europe (1987), two volumes
 Tipton FB 1992 'Storia economica [Economic history]', Milan: Jaca Book. French translation: Histoire Économique. Paris: Editions Mentha, Milan and Paris, Italy 
 Frank B. Tipton (1993), “Historical Perspectives on the Problem of Regional Integration in a United Germany” in the European Studies Journal, volume X: United Germany and Europe: Towards 1990 and Beyond, pages 57–77
 Tipton FB, Jarvis D and Welch A 2003 'Re-defining the borders between public and private in Southeast Asia: Malaysia, Philippines, Vietnam, Thailand and Indonesia. Financial sector, telecommunications, information and communications technologies, higher education', The Research Institute for Asia and the Pacific (RIAP), Sydney, Australia
 Frank B. Tipton, A History of Modern Germany Since 1815, Berkeley: University of California, 2003, 
 Tipton FB 2007 'The Asian Firms: History, Institutions and Management', Edward Elgar, London, United Kingdom, pp. 432

References

External links 
 Tipton at the University of Sydney

Historians of Germany
Academic staff of the University of Sydney
Historians of Europe
20th-century Australian historians
Living people
1943 births
Place of birth missing (living people)
Economic historians
Stanford University alumni
Harvard University alumni